is a former professional Japanese baseball player.  He played for the Saitama Seibu Lions  .

References

1987 births
Living people
Baseball people from Tokyo
Japanese baseball players
Nippon Professional Baseball catchers
Fukuoka SoftBank Hawks players
Saitama Seibu Lions players
Japanese baseball coaches
Nippon Professional Baseball coaches